J.F. Willumsens Museum is in Frederikssund, Denmark. The art museum is operated by Frederikssund Municipality. 

The art museum is dedicated to the works of the artist Jens Ferdinand Willumsen (1863–1958) and was opened in 1957. Jens Ferdinand Willumsen   was a Danish painter, sculptor, graphic artist, architect and photographer  who became associated with the movements of Symbolism and Expressionism. The museum contains a wide range of Willumsen's artworks, including paintings, sketches, graphics, ceramics, sculptures, photographs and architecture.

The museum was designed by the architect Tyge Hvass, and a new wing was opened in 2005, based upon designs  by architect Theo Bjerg (1936-2019). The head of the museum from 1973-1990 and 1993-2006 was art historian mag. art. Leila Krogh (born 1943).

See also
 List of single-artist museums

References

External links 
 
 "Aladdin, Willumsen and Thorvaldsen", Thorvaldsens Museum Archive

Art museums and galleries in Denmark
Museums in the Capital Region of Denmark
Museums established in 1957